Pythonichthys is a genus of eels of the family Heterenchelyidae that occur in tropical waters of the eastern Pacific Ocean off of Panama and in the Atlantic Ocean near the Caribbean Sea and the west coast of Africa.  It contains the following described species:

 Pythonichthys asodes Rosenblatt & Rubinoff, 1972 (Pacific mud eel)
 Pythonichthys macrurus (Regan, 1912) (Long-tailed short-faced eel)
 Pythonichthys microphthalmus (Regan, 1912) (Short-tailed short-faced eel)
 Pythonichthys sanguineus Poey, 1868 (no common name)

References

Eels
Heterenchelyidae